Le Correspondant was a French Catholic review, founded in March 1829 by Louis de Carné,  and , under the motto "Civil and religious liberty throughout the universe" ("Liberté civile et religieuse par tout l'univers"). It ceased publication in 1937.

References

1829 establishments in France
1937 disestablishments in France
Catholic newspapers
Defunct newspapers published in France
French-language newspapers
History of Catholicism in France
Newspapers established in 1829
Publications disestablished in 1937